Arun Singh may refer to:

Arun Singh (cricketer) (born 1975), Indian cricketer
Arun Singh (politician, born 1944), Indian politician and union minister of state for defence in the Government of India
Arun Singh (politician, born 1965), National General Secretary of the Bharatiya Janata Party of India from 2015
Arun Kumar Singh, Indian Ambassador to the United States (2015–2016)